Kilel is a surname of Kenyan origin. Notable people with the surname include:

Caroline Kilel (born 1981), Kenyan long-distance runner
David Kilel (born 1984), Kenyan long-distance track runner

Kenyan names
Surnames of Kenyan origin